The Druid class was a class of two sloops of wooden construction built for the Royal Navy between 1760 and 1761. Both were built by contract with commercial builders to a common design derived from the Cruizer design of 1732 by Richard Stacey, the Master Shipwright at Deptford dockyard in that era, but with some noticeable differences.

Both were ordered on 19 August 1760, and contracts with the respective builders were agreed on 22 and 25 August. They were two-masted (snow-rigged) vessels, although they were both later reported to be converted to three-masted ship sloops.

Hunter was captured by two American privateers off Boston on 23 November 1775, but was retaken by HMS Greyhound the following day.

Vessels

References 

McLaughlan, Ian. The Sloop of War 1650-1763. Seaforth Publishing, 2014. .
Winfield, Rif. British Warships in the Age of Sail 1714-1792: Design, Construction, Careers and Fates. Seaforth Publishing, 2007. .

Sloop classes